Jeffrey Stewart (born 28 October 1955) is a Scottish actor. He is best known for playing PC Reg Hollis on the ITV drama series The Bill from 1984 to 2008.

Early life
Stewart was born in Aberdeen. He and his family moved to Southampton, Hampshire, when he was three months old. His father worked in shipyards and then for Fawley Refinery.

Career
Stewart has played numerous roles in television series, including Harry Fellows in Crossroads in 1981 and Dukkha in the 1982 Doctor Who story Kinda. He played a police constable in Hi-De-Hi! in 1983, the same year "Woodentop" (the pilot episode of The Bill) aired. His character on The Bill, Reg Hollis, is his best known role to date, regularly appearing opposite Chris Ellison. Reg is mentioned but not seen in "Woodentop", so Stewart's first appearance in the series was in the first regular episode, "Funny Ol' Business - Cops & Robbers". By March 2007, Stewart was the last member of the cast remaining from that first episode.

In 2001, Stewart appeared on Lily Savage's Blankety Blank. In 2009, Stewart appeared in the music video for "Black and Blue" by Miike Snow. The video starred him as a reclusive musician with a penchant for creating animatronic performers in his dingy apartment. In 2011, he portrayed a German-Russian man in a Soviet prison in Under Jakob's Ladder. He won a best actor award at the 2011 Manhattan Film Festival for the role. He is often confused with the storyboard artist who also voices characters such as Mr. Tickle in The Mr. Men Show.

Personal life
On 8 January 2008, Stewart cut his wrists after being told that his contract for The Bill would not be renewed. He survived the suicide attempt after calling for help and being taken to hospital by an ambulance. He later said of the incident: "I love being an actor. My work as an actor is very important to me – it's my life, and the thought of this suddenly changing had an extremely serious effect on me."

Stewart is fond of the Hotel Chelsea in New York City, having stayed there on a number of occasions. He is friends with a number of the building's permanent residents. He was staying at the Chelsea in 2011 when the hotel changed ownership and closed to transient guests. He initially refused to leave, even calling in the police to assist him, but was persuaded by hotel staff to leave.

Filmography

Film

Television

Music videos

Awards

References

External links

1955 births
Living people
Scottish male television actors
Scottish male film actors
Male actors from Aberdeen
20th-century Scottish male actors
21st-century Scottish male actors